Alfonso Emilio Sánchez Castillo (born 16 June 1994) is a Mexican professional footballer who plays as a midfielder for Liga MX club Mazatlán.

Club career
On 24 June 2020, Club América announced that Emilio returned to the team after being on loan at Club Tijuana.

Notes

References

External links

Alfonso Emilio Sánchez Castillo at Lobos BUAP

1994 births
Living people
Footballers from Aguascalientes
People from Aguascalientes City
Mexican footballers
Club América footballers
Alebrijes de Oaxaca players
Lobos BUAP footballers
Club Atlético Zacatepec players
Club Tijuana footballers
Ascenso MX players
Liga MX players
Association football midfielders